The 1970 Minnesota Golden Gophers football team represented the University of Minnesota in the 1970 Big Ten Conference football season. In their 17th year under head coach Murray Warmath, the Golden Gophers compiled a 3–6–1 record and were outscored by their opponents by a combined total of 237 to 180.
 
Defensive back Jeff Wright received the team's Most Valuable Player award. Linebacker Bill Light and Wright were named All-Big Ten first team. Offensive tackle Alvin Hawes, running back Barry Mayer and safety Walt Bowser were named All-Big Ten second team. Mayer was named an Academic All-American. Mayer was also named Academic All-Big Ten. The team included offensive lineman, Richard Fliehr, better known as professional wrestler Ric Flair.

Total attendance at five home games was 225,468, which averaged to 45,093. The largest crowd was against Nebraska. 1970 was the first season Memorial Stadium had a Tartan Turf surface.

Schedule

Roster

References

Minnesota
Minnesota Golden Gophers football seasons
Minnesota Golden Gophers football